William Robert Dempster Dallas (6 March 1931 - 17 May 2015) was a Scottish former professional footballer who played as a defender. He made appearances in the Scottish Football League with St Mirren and in the English Football League with Wrexham

References

1931 births
2015 deaths
Scottish footballers
Association football defenders
Luton Town F.C. players
St Mirren F.C. players
Wrexham A.F.C. players
Nuneaton Borough F.C. players
Footballers from Glasgow
English Football League players